Wizard Island is the fourth album by The Jeff Lorber Fusion, released in 1980. The album was both Lorber's and the group's first to reach number one on the US Jazz Album chart.

Track listing
All tracks written by Jeff Lorber, except "Fusion Juice", written by Kenny G.

Personnel 
The Jeff Lorber Fusion
 Jeff Lorber – acoustic piano, Yamaha electric grand piano, Fender Rhodes, Minimoog, Moog Modular System, Oberheim OB-X, Prophet-5
 Danny Wilson – electric bass
 Dennis Bradford – drums
 Kenny Gorelick – flute, soprano saxophone, tenor saxophone

Guest Musicians
 Chick Corea – Minimoog (9)
 Jay Koder – guitars
 Paulinho da Costa – percussion

Production 
 Jeff Lorber – producer 
 Rik Pekkonen – engineer, mixing 
 Jeffrey Ross – album coordinator, management 
 Ria Lewerke-Shapiro – art direction, design 
 Mathew Cohen – front and back cover artwork 
 Gary Regester – photography

Charts

External links
 Jeff Lorber-Wizard Island at Discogs

References

1980 albums
Jeff Lorber albums
Arista Records albums